Sister Aloysius McVeigh, R.S.M., (April 10, 1923 – December 25, 2008) was an Irish artist, iconographer and teacher. She was from Dungiven, County Londonderry, Northern Ireland.

Bridie entered the Sisters of Mercy convent in Derry in 1940, taking the religious name Aloysius in 1943. She taught art in several schools in the city. She was most noted for the 20 years she taught at St Mary's College, Derry. Initially this was an art teacher and then subsequently as principal. After studying painting and obtaining an Master of Fine Arts degree in 1980 from the Yale School of Art, Yale University, she returned to Belfast, where she taught art at St Mary's University College.

Sr. Aloysius was a founding member of the Association of Irish Iconographers. She stated that her iconography is an act of prayer. She is buried at St. Patrick's Roman Catholic Church alongside family members in Dungiven.

There is an Annual Sister Aloysius Religious Art competition in her honour. It is open to young people who are studying Art and Design at GCSE and A Level in schools in the Roman Catholic Derry Diocese.

Works in public places

Trinity, Thornhill Parish Chapel, Culmore Road, Derry, 1988
Our Lady of the Sign (Stained Glass Window) Blessed Sacrament Chapel, Letterkenny, Co. Donegal, 1988
Our Lady of Perpetual Succour, Castlefin Church, Co. Tyrone, 1989
St Patrick, Parish Church, Greencastle, Co. Tyrone, 1989
Mother of Perpetual Succour, Parish Church, Clogher, Co. Tyrone, 1989
Stations of the Cross, Rosslea Parish Church, Co. Fermanagh, 1990
Mother of Perpetual Succour, Castlederg Church, Co. Tyrone, 1990	
Mother of Perpetual Succour, Basilica in Lough Derg, Co. Donegal, 1991
Crucifixion Cross, Poor Clare Monastery, Clifden Street, Belfast, Co. Antrim, 1992
Annunciation, Psychiatric Hospital, Limerick City, 1993
Our Lady of Mercy, Mercy International Centre, 64 Lr. Baggot St., Dublin 2, 1993
Christ, Source of Life, Pantocrator. Coolaney Parish Church, Coolaney, Co. Sligo, 1993
Queen of All Saints, All Saints Parish Church, Newtowncunningham, Co. Donegal, 1995
Pantocrator, St, Catherine's Nursing Home, Culmore Road, Derry, 1995
Mother of Perpetual Succour, Church of the Irish Martyrs, Letterkenny, Co. Donegal, 1996
Baptism of Our Lord, Strabane Parish Church, Strabane, Co. Tyrone, 1996
St Brendan, the Navigator, Church of Our Lady & St Brendan, 1996
St Kevin, Glendalough Parish Church, Glendalough, Co.Wicklow, 1998
St Coca, Parish Church of St Coca, Kilcock, Co. Kildare, 1999
Lorcan O Toole, Glendalough Parish Church, Glendalough, Co. Wicklow, 1999
St Gabriel, Linsfort Retreat House, Linsfort, Co. Donegal, 2001
Nativity, Church of the Nativity, Poleglass, Belfast, 2001
St Brigid, St Brigid's Parish Church, Kildare, Co. Kildare, 2001
St Michael, All Saints Parish Church, Newtowncunningham, Co. Donegal, 2004
St Michael, Linsfort Retreat House, Linsfort, Co. Donegal, 2005
The Mercy Window, The Playhouse, 5-7 Artillery St, Derry, unveiled posthumously, 2009

References

Year of birth missing
2008 deaths